David Gene Parker (born June 9, 1951), nicknamed "The Cobra," is an American former professional baseball player. He played in Major League Baseball as a right fielder from 1973 to 1991. A seven-time All-Star, Parker won two National League batting titles and was the 1978 National League Most Valuable Player.

Parker was the second professional athlete to earn an average of $1 million per year, having signed a five-year, $5 million contract in January 1979. Parker's career achievements include 2,712 hits, 339 home runs, 1,493 runs batted in and a lifetime batting average of .290. Parker was also known as a solid defensive outfielder during the first half of his career with a powerful arm, winning three straight Gold Gloves during his prime. From 1975 to 1979, he threw out 72 runners, including 26 in 1977.

Early life
Parker grew up in Cincinnati near Crosley Field, where he learned to play baseball on the stadium's parking lots. His father, Dick Parker, was a shipping clerk in a foundry. Dave Parker attended Courter Tech High School. He has said his favorite sport was football, and he starred at tailback but injured a knee in a game during his senior year and gave up the game. Also a baseball star, one of his fondest memories is playing at Western Hills High School (alma mater of Pete Rose), where he hit a home run that landed on the roof of a Frisch's restaurant.

Playing career

Pittsburgh Pirates
In 1973, as a member of the Pirates AAA minor league ball team Charleston (WV) Charlies, legend has it that Parker hit a home run that landed on a coal car on a passing train and the ball was later picked up in Columbus, Ohio. 
However, in a 1975 interview, Parker stated, "When I played for Charleston I always had the ambition to hit a home run onto a moving train. I really used to shoot for that. I hit a few on the tracks, but never as a train was going by." He began his major league career on July 12, 1973, with the Pittsburgh Pirates, for whom he played from 1973 to 1983. His first full season came in 1975, when he led the National League in slugging percentage (.541) and finished third in NL MVP voting.

At the 1977 MLB All-Star Game he became the only player in history to have worn batting helmets from two different teams—neither of them his own—in the same game, wearing a San Diego Padres helmet early on before swapping it out for a Cincinnati Reds one.

In 1977, he was National League batting champion, a feat he repeated in 1978 when he was named the National League MVP. This was in spite of a collision at home plate with John Stearns during a game against the Mets on June 30, 1978, in which Parker fractured his jaw and cheekbone; he wore a specially constructed facemask in order to minimize his time away from the lineup. The Pirates rewarded him with baseball's first million-dollar-per-year contract. The following year, he was an instrumental part of the Pirates' World Series championship team.

During a game in 1979, a powerful hit he made to right field was very difficult to throw into the infield, because he had "knocked the cover off the ball."  One of the seams on the ball ruptured, making nearly half of the cover come loose.

Pirate fans angered by his million-dollar contract threw "nuts and bolts and bullets and batteries" at him, as pitcher Kent Tekulve stated. A typo in a news story made it appear they threw car batteries.

In 1981 at a point in his career when it looked as if he would one day rank among the game's all-time greats, Lawrence Ritter and Donald Honig included him in their book The 100 Greatest Baseball Players of All Time. The authors, noting that Parker had succeeded Roberto Clemente at the position, wrote, "Someone must have a fondness for right field in Pittsburgh."

Parker took after his Pirates teammate Willie Stargell in warming up in the on-deck circle with a sledgehammer (when most batters would use a simple lead-weighted bat).

In the early 1980s however, Parker's hitting suffered due to injuries, weight problems and his increasing cocaine use. He became one of the central figures in a drug scandal that spread through the major leagues.

Later career
At the end of the 1983 season, Parker became a free agent and signed with the Cincinnati Reds. In Cincinnati, his hometown, he returned to the form that made him an All-Star in Pittsburgh. In 1985, he enjoyed his best season since he won the 1978 MVP with a .312 batting average and 34 home runs; he also led the National League with 125 RBIs, 42 doubles, 80 extra-base hits and 350 total bases. Parker finished second in 1985 MVP voting to Willie McGee. Parker was also the winner of the league's first-ever Home Run Derby in 1985.

Following the season, Parker was among several players who testified against a dealer in the Pittsburgh drug trials. Named as "regular users", Parker and six other players were suspended for the following season. The sentences were commuted, however, in exchange for donating ten percent of their base salaries to drug-related community service, submitting to random drug testing, and contributing 100 hours of drug-related community service.

After the 1987 season, Cincinnati traded Parker to the Oakland Athletics for José Rijo and Tim Birtsas. In Oakland, Parker was able to extend his career by spending most of his time as a designated hitter. Although injuries and age caught up to him to a degree – he hit just .257 with 12 homers in 377 at-bats in 1988 and .264 with 22 homers in 553 at-bats in 1989 – his veteran leadership was a significant factor in the A's consecutive World Series appearances which included another World Series title for Parker 1989, exactly 10 years after his first one with the Pirates in '79.

Parker signed with the Milwaukee Brewers for the 1990 season and had a solid year as the Brewers' DH with a .289 average and 21 home runs in 610 at-bats. He was even selected as a reserve for the 1990 All-Star Game. Milwaukee opted for youth however, at the end of the year and traded the aging Parker to the Angels for Dante Bichette.

Parker's last season was 1991. He played for the California Angels until late in the season before being released. The Toronto Blue Jays then signed him as insurance for the pennant race, and Parker hit .333 in limited action. Since he was acquired too late in the season, he did not qualify for inclusion on the post-season roster and was unable to play in the American League Championship Series against the Minnesota Twins, which the Blue Jays lost in five games. Parker retired at end of the season.

Retirement
Parker has served as a first-base coach for the Anaheim Angels, a batting coach for the St. Louis Cardinals in 1998, and a special hitting instructor for Pittsburgh. He owned several Popeyes Chicken franchises in Cincinnati until selling his interest in them in 2012 after 25 years.

Parker never got more than 24% of votes on Hall of Fame ballots, and his 15-year Baseball Writers' Association of America eligibility was exhausted on the 2011 ballot. He is currently under consideration for the Modern Baseball era committee. Supporters of Parker's Hall of Fame candidacy argue that Parker's involvement with the Pittsburgh drug trials has contributed to his not being voted into the Hall of Fame, which may have also harmed the candidacies of Keith Hernandez (who never received more than 10.8% and fell off the writers' ballot on his ninth try) and Tim Raines (debuted at 24.3%, but was elected on his tenth year on the ballot), serving as a precursor to those listed on the Mitchell Report not being voted into the Hall of Fame due to steroid abuse. Critics say that Parker's stats fall short of accepted standards of inclusion in the Hall. While Tim Raines became a cause célèbre among the sabermetric community which pushed for his election, Dave Parker does not fare as well when using advanced stats.

Parker has had both of his knees replaced due to injuries from his playing career. In 2013, he confirmed to the Pittsburgh Tribune-Review that he had been diagnosed with Parkinson's disease. He is involved in raising money to find a cure for Parkinson's disease through the Dave Parker 39 Foundation.

Parker has six children. He currently resides in Loveland, Ohio, near Cincinnati, with his wife, Kellye.

Parker was elected to the Reds Hall of Fame Class of 2014, which also included fellow Cincinnati natives Ron Oester and Ken Griffey Jr. In 2012, he was inducted into the Cincinnati Public Schools Athletic Hall of Fame. On September 3, 2022, he was inducted into the Pittsburgh Pirates Hall of Fame as part of its inaugural class.

See also

 List of Major League Baseball career home run leaders
 List of Major League Baseball career hits leaders
 List of Major League Baseball career doubles leaders
 List of Major League Baseball career runs scored leaders
 List of Major League Baseball career runs batted in leaders
 List of Major League Baseball annual runs batted in leaders
 List of Major League Baseball batting champions
 List of Major League Baseball annual doubles leaders
 List of Major League Baseball career stolen bases leaders
 List of Major League Baseball career total bases leaders
 List of St. Louis Cardinals coaches
 List of sportspeople sanctioned for doping offences

References

External links
, or Lesters Legends, or Pura Pelota (Venezuelan Winter League)

1951 births
Living people
African-American baseball coaches
African-American baseball players
Águilas Cibaeñas players
American expatriate baseball players in the Dominican Republic
American expatriate baseball players in Canada
American League All-Stars
Anaheim Angels coaches
Baseball coaches from Mississippi
Baseball players from Mississippi
Baseball coaches from Ohio
Baseball players from Cincinnati
California Angels players
Charleston Charlies players
Cincinnati Reds players
Gold Glove Award winners
Gulf Coast Pirates players
Major League Baseball All-Star Game MVPs
Major League Baseball first base coaches
Major League Baseball hitting coaches
Major League Baseball right fielders
Major League Baseball players suspended for drug offenses
Milwaukee Brewers players
Monroe Pirates players
National League All-Stars
National League batting champions
National League Most Valuable Player Award winners
National League RBI champions
Navegantes del Magallanes players
American expatriate baseball players in Venezuela
Oakland Athletics players
People from Grenada, Mississippi
People with Parkinson's disease
Pittsburgh Pirates players
Toronto Blue Jays players
Waterbury Pirates players
Salem Pirates players
Silver Slugger Award winners
St. Louis Cardinals coaches
People from Calhoun City, Mississippi
21st-century African-American people
20th-century African-American sportspeople